Scott Douglas Miller is an American academic administrator who has served as the fourth president of Virginia Wesleyan University since 2015. He is also an author and career educator.

Early life
Born in 1959, Miller is a native of Ridley Park, Pennsylvania.  He graduated from General McLane High School in Edinboro, PA in 1977.

Education
Miller holds a bachelor's degree (B.A.) from West Virginia Wesleyan College, a master's degree (M.S.) from the University of Dayton, an education specialist degree (Ed. S.) from Vanderbilt University, and a doctoral degree (Ph.D.) from Union Institute & University.

Career

College and University Presidencies
Miller was named as the fourth president of Virginia Wesleyan University on February 25, 2015. As president of VWU, Miller helped guide the university through the change from college to university in 2017 as the university welcomed the addition of graduate programs, online learning opportunities, a collaborative campus in Japan, and the Batten Honors College.

While he is the current President of VWU, Miller previously served as the president of Bethany College (2007–15), Wesley College (1997-2007), and Lincoln Memorial University (1991–97).  He was Executive Vice President and Vice President for Development at LMU (1984–91) before becoming president.  Previously, he was Director of College Relations and Alumni Affairs at Rio Grande College (now University of Rio Grande).

Leadership positions 
Miller served as Chair of the Climate Leadership Network from 2019 to 2021 and serves on the Board of Directors of Boston-based Second Nature, an international environmental and climate advocacy group.

He is a former President of the National Association of Schools, Colleges, and Universities of the United Methodist Church (NASCUMC). Miller served as the President of the North American Association of Methodist Schools, Colleges and Universities (NAAMSCU) from 2019 to 2021. 

During his time at Bethany College, he served on the Board of Directors of The Council of Colleges and Universities of the Christian Church (Disciples of Christ) and was President of TCCUCC for four years. He is Chair of the Board of Directors of Washington, D.C.-based executive search firm Academic Search, Inc., and the Vice Chair of the American Academic Leadership Institute.

Publications 
Miller is a regular columnist for The Virginian-Pilot, HuffPost, College Planning and Management, and Dwyer Education Strategies Enrollment Manager. He is the author of a widely distributed e-newsletter, "The President's Letter" and a daily blog, "Dialogue".

For 10 years, he served as the executive editor of Presidential Perspectives, an online presidential thought series that resulted in 11 books. The series transitioned to a new name, President to President, and new sponsor in 2016. He has co-published six volumes of President to President.

Honors and awards
 Wesley College named Scott D. Miller Stadium, 2007.  In 2021, the facility was acquired by Delaware State University Downtown and renamed the Scott D. Miller Stadium & Sports Complex to reflect the inclusion of the Drass Field, Reed Field, duPont Field, Wesley Field House, and the athletic administration annex.
 Doctor of Humane Letters, honoris causa, West Virginia Wesleyan College, 2011. 
 Distinguished Alumnus Award, General McLane High School, 2013 .
 Miller and VWU named Chesapeake Bay Foundation Conservationist of the Year, 2017.
 Humanitarian of the Year, Virginia Center for Inclusive Communities, 2022

Personal life
He and his wife, Annie Miller, have two daughters and four grandchildren. They reside in Virginia Beach, Virginia.

References

Heads of universities and colleges in the United States
Virginia Wesleyan University 
Living people
1959 births